The United States–Africa Leaders Summit 2022 was an international conference held in Washington, D.C., from December 13–15, 2022. The summit was hosted by United States President Joe Biden, and attended by leaders from 49 African states, as well as the head of the African Union Commission. 

The event's overall goal was to rebuild and strengthen relations between the United States and African countries. Specifically, the summit focused on issues relating to health, climate change, food security, conflicts, and cooperation in space.

Background
The first United States–Africa Leaders Summit was held in 2014 by United States President Barack Obama. In July 2022, Biden announced that he would hold a second summit. Under the administration of his predecessor, Donald Trump, foreign policy emphasis was shifted away from Africa. In addition, the influence of other powers, such as China, grew significantly on the continent during the years preceding the second summit.

Schedule

Day 1

Sub-forums on the summit topics were held on the first day.

 African and Diaspora Young Leaders Forum
 Civil Society Forum
 African Growth and Opportunity Act (AGOA) Trade Ministerial
 U.S. Africa Space Forum
 Peace, Security, and Governance Forum
 Partnering for Sustainable Health Cooperation
 Conservation, Climate Adaptation, and a Just Energy Transition

Day 2

The U.S.-Africa Business Forum was held on the second day, consisting of four sessions.

 Charting the Course: The Future of U.S.-Africa Trade & Investment Relations
 Building a Sustainable Future: Partnerships to Finance African Infrastructure and the Energy Transition
 Growing Agribusiness: Partnerships to Strengthen Food Security and Value Chain
 Advancing Digital Connectivity: Partnerships to Enable Inclusive Growth Through Technology

After the forum, President Joe Biden delivered a keynote address, and joined leaders at a state dinner.

Day 3

The leaders sessions and a working lunch were held on the final day.

 Leaders Session – Partnering on Agenda 2063
 Discussion Session 1: "An Africa of good governance, democracy, respect for human rights, justice, and the rule of law"
 Discussion Session 2: "A peaceful and secure Africa"
 Discussion Session 3: "A prosperous Africa based on inclusive growth and sustainable development"
 Leaders Working Lunch – Multilateral Partnerships with Africa to Meet Global Challenges
 Leaders Session – Promoting Food Security and Food Systems Resilience

A "family photo" was taken between the working lunch and the final session.

Participants
At the time of the summit, there were 54 fully recognized states in Africa. All 54 were members of the African Union, though membership had been suspended for 4 of these, due to recent coups in those countries. Invitations were extended to 49 of the remaining 50 that were "in good standing" with the African Union. 

The African Union was also invited. All invitations were accepted. All but 4 of the invited countries sent heads of state or heads of government. Biden met with the leaders as a group, and did not sit down with any of them individually.

Dignitaries
 

  – Chairperson of the African Union Commission – Moussa Faki Mahamat

Excluded countries
  – membership in African Union suspended
  – limited diplomatic relations with United States
  – membership in African Union suspended
  – membership in African Union suspended
  – membership in African Union suspended
  – no diplomatic relations with United States

References

External links

2022 conferences
2022 in international relations
2022 in Washington, D.C.
December 2022 events in the United States
Politics of Africa
Diplomatic conferences in the United States
2022 summit
Presidency of Joe Biden
History of the White House